There are two different kinds of swimming records in Malaysia and certified by Malaysia Swimming (MAS):
 National record, more commonly referred to in Malaysia as the rekod kebangsaan: the best time recorded anywhere in the world by a swimmer or team holding Malaysian citizenship. So far Malaysia Swimming maintains an official list only in long course events.
 Malaysian All-Comers record: the best time recorded within Malaysia by a swimmer or team regardless of nationality.

Current Malaysian national records

Long course (50 metres)

Men

|-bgcolor=#DDDDDD
|colspan=9|
|-

|-bgcolor=#DDDDDD
|colspan=9|
|-

|-bgcolor=#DDDDDD
|colspan=9|
|-

|-bgcolor=#DDDDDD
|colspan=9|
|-

|-bgcolor=#DDDDDD
|colspan=9|
|-

Women

|-bgcolor=#DDDDDD
|colspan=9|
|-

|-bgcolor=#DDDDDD
|colspan=9|
|-

|-bgcolor=#DDDDDD
|colspan=9|
|-

|-bgcolor=#DDDDDD
|colspan=9|
|-

|-bgcolor=#DDDDDD
|colspan=9|
|-

Mixed relay

Short course (25 metres)

Men

Women

Mixed relay

Current Malaysian All-Comers records

Long course (50 metres)

Men

Women

Mixed relay

References
General
Malaysian Long Course Records 23 July 2016 updated
Specific

External links
MAS website

National records in swimming
Records
Swimming records
Swimming